Yining Airport   is an airport serving Yining (Ghulja), the capital of Ili Kazakh Autonomous Prefecture, Xinjiang, China.

Facilities
It has one runway designated 06/24 which measures .

Airlines and destinations

See also
 List of airports in China

References

External links
 
 

Airports in Xinjiang
Ili Kazakh Autonomous Prefecture